The Bold Venture Stakes is a Thoroughbred horse race run annually at Woodbine Racetrack in Toronto, Ontario, Canada. Open to horses age three and older, it is contested during the second half of July on Tapeta synthetic dirt over a distance of six and a half furlongs. Currently the race offers a purse of CAN$125,000.

History
Inaugurated in 1956 at the Fort Erie Racetrack, the race was named in honor of Bold Venture, winner of the 1936 Kentucky Derby and Preakness Stakes.

This race was upgraded to a Grade III event in 2012.

Fatal Bullet set a new track record time for the  furlong distance of 1:14.54 when winning the 2008 renewal.

Winners

Earlier winners

 2006 - Are You Serious (1:29.81; 7.5 furlongs)
 2005 - Judiths Wild Rush (1:15.41)
 2004 - I'm the Tiger (1:15.69)
 2003 - Milligan the Great (1:16.77)
 2002 - Sambuca on Ice (1:16.06)
 2001 - Tempered Appeal (1:16.05)
 2000 - One Way Love (1:16.35)
 1999 - One Way Love (1:16.74)  
 1998 - Deputy Inxs (1:15.60)  
 1997 - Parisianprospector (1:17.00)  
 1996 - Parental Pressure (1:17.60)  
 1995 - Sea Wall (1:17.40)  
 1994 - Premier Explosion (1:15.60)  
 1993 - Megas Vukefalos (1:18.60)  
 1992 - Canadian Silver (1:17.00)  
 1991 - Key Spirit (1:17.60)  
 1990 - Woden (1:17.80)
 1989 - Overpeer (1:18.20)  
 1988 - Jamaican Gigolo (1:18.80)  
 1987 - Jamaican Gigolo (1:19.60)  
 1986 - S S Enterprise (1:19.00)  
 1985 - Aeronotic (1:17.60)  
 1984 - Nancy's Champion (1:20.40) 
 1983 - Play the Hornpipe (1:19.80) 
 1982 - Frost King (1:20.20)  
 1981 - Impressive Prince (1:19.00)  
 1980 - Royal Sparkle (1:21.60)  
 1979 - Stutz Bearcat (1:20.40)  
 1978 - Instead of Roses (1:20.20)  
 1977 - Pres de Tu (1:18.40)  
 1976 - Royal Chocolate (1:25.00; 7 furlongs) 
 1975 - Frohlich (1:10.20; 6 furlongs)
 1974 - Queen's Splendour (1:10.60)  
 1973 - Dawes Road (1:12.60)  
 1972 - Briartic (1:09.40)  
 1971 - Coup Landing (1:11.40)  
 1970 - Perfect Tan (1:13.00)  
 1969 - Melindroso (1:10.80)  
 1968 - Lane (1:11.20)  
 1967 - One Sunday (1:10.40; 6.5 furlongs)  
 1966 - Bright Object (1:10.00)  
 1965 - Lebon M L (1:12.00) 
 1964 - Vindent de Paul (1:10.80)  
 1963 - First Minister (1:13.60)  
 1962 - First Minister (1:11.20)  
 1961 - Reactor (1:08.20; 5 furlongs)  
 1960 - War Eagle (1:04.80)  
 1959 - Riz (0:59.00)  
 1958 - Nearctic (0:58.20)  
 1957 - Pot Hunter (1:01.00)  
 1956 - Navy Page (1:00.40) INAUGURAL RUNNING

See also
 List of Canadian flat horse races

References

2018 Woodbine Media Guide 

Graded stakes races in Canada
Open sprint category horse races
Recurring sporting events established in 1956
Woodbine Racetrack